Rolpe Dorje (1340–1383) was the fourth Gyalwa Karmapa (the head of the Karma Kagyu, a subschool of the Kagyu School of Tibetan Buddhism). According to legend, the fourth Karmapa's mother, while pregnant, could hear the sound of the mantra Om Mani Padme Hum while the child was in her womb and the baby said the mantra as soon as he was born. His early life was full of miracles and manifested a total continuity of the teachings and qualities of his former incarnation, including receiving teachings in his dreams. While in his teens, he received the formal transmissions of both the Kagyu and Nyingma lineages from the great Nyingma guru Yungtönpa, the third Karmapa's spiritual heir, now very advanced in years. At the age of nineteen, he accepted Toghon Temür's invitation to return to China where he gave teachings  for three years and established many temples and monasteries.

On his return to Tibet, while in the Tsongkha region, Rolpi Dorje gave lay ordination to a very special child, whom he predicted to be of great importance to Buddhism in Tibet. This was Tsong Khapa, the future founder of the Gelugpa school, famous for its Dalai Lamas.

When Temur died, the Mongol dynasty of China ended and the Ming dynasty began. The new emperor invited Rolpi Dorje, who declined the invitation but sent another lama in his stead. Rolpi Dorje composed  mystic songs throughout his life and was an accomplished poet, fond of Indian poetics. He is also remembered for creating a huge painting (thangka) following a vision of one of his students, who had imagined a Buddha image over a 100 metres tall. The Karmapa, on horseback, traced the Buddha's outline with hoofprints. The design was measured and traced on cloth. It took 500 workers more than a year to complete the thangka, which depicted the Buddha, Maitreya and Manjusri; the founders of Mahayana.

References
 The Kagyu Lineage and the Karmapas
 Ken Holmes, Karmapa, Altea Publishing 1995, 
 The 4th Gyalwa Karmapa, Rolpe Dorje
 Lama Kunsang, Lama Pemo, Marie Aubèle (2012). History of the Karmapas: The Odyssey of the Tibetan Masters with the Black Crown. Snow Lion Publications, Ithaca, New York. .

Further reading 

4
1340 births
1383 deaths
14th-century lamas
14th-century Tibetan people